The women's water polo tournament at the 2022 World Aquatics Championships is held from 20 June to 2 July 2022. This is the 15th time that the women's water polo tournament has been played since the first edition in 1986.

The United States secured their fourth consecutive and seventh overall title with a win over Hungary, while the Netherlands beat Italy to win the bronze medal.

Qualification

Russia was excluded due to the 2022 Russian invasion of Ukraine.
China and Japan withdrew before the tournament.

Draw
The draw was held on 12 April 2022.

Seeding

Preliminary round

Group A

Group B

Group C

Group D

Knockout stage

Bracket
Championship bracket

5th place bracket

9th place bracket

13th place bracket

Playoffs

Quarterfinals

13–16th place semifinals

9–12th place semifinals

5–8th place semifinals

Semifinals

15th place game

13th place game

Eleventh place game

Ninth place game

Seventh place game

Fifth place game

Third place game

Final

Final ranking

Awards and statistics

Top goalscorers

Awards
The awards were announced on 2 July 2022.

References

2022
Women